Walter Thurston Pate (August 25, 1874 - September 17, 1950) was an American politician and a Democratic member of the Mississippi House of Representatives from 1920 to 1924.

Biography 
Pate was born on August 25, 1874, in Airmount, Yalobusha County, Mississippi. His parents were Larkin and Susan (Tankersley) Pate. He attended the University of Mississippi from 1894 to 1897. He married Irene McLaurin in 1907, and after her death in 1911, he married Sarah Calhoon Hall in 1920. They had one son. He served in the U. S. Army in World War I as a captain. He was elected to the Mississippi House of Representatives, representing Hinds County, from 1920 to 1924. He died on September 17, 1950.

References 

1874 births
1950 deaths
People from Yalobusha County, Mississippi
Democratic Party members of the Mississippi House of Representatives
University of Mississippi alumni